On the Stroke of Twelve is a 1927 American silent drama film directed by Charles J. Hunt and starring David Torrence, June Marlowe and Lloyd Whitlock.

Cast
 David Torrence as Henry Rutledge
 June Marlowe as Doris Bainbridge
 Danny O'Shea as Jack Rutledge
 Lloyd Whitlock as James Horton
 Lillian Worth as Marie Conyers
 Charles West as Charles Wright
 Martin Turner as George

References

Bibliography
 Robert B. Connelly. The Silents: Silent Feature Films, 1910-36, Volume 40, Issue 2. December Press, 1998.

External links
 

1927 films
1927 drama films
1920s English-language films
American silent feature films
Silent American drama films
American black-and-white films
Films directed by Charles J. Hunt
Rayart Pictures films
1920s American films